Elyazid Maddour (born October 14, 1987 in Larbaâ Nath Irathen (Tizi Ouzou), Algeria) is a footballer. He currently plays as a defender for JS Kabylie in the Algerian league.

Club career
 2007-pres. JS Kabylie

Honours
 Won the Algerian League once with JS Kabylie in 2008

See also
Football in Algeria
List of football clubs in Algeria

References

External links
 JS Kabylie Profile
 DZFoot Profile

1987 births
Algerian footballers
Living people
Kabyle people
JS Kabylie players
People from Larbaâ Nath Irathen
Association football defenders
21st-century Algerian people